Maplescombe is a hamlet in the West Kingsdown civil parish, in the Sevenoaks District, in the county of Kent, England. 


Location 
It is about eight miles northeast of the town of Sevenoaks and is near the large village of Kemsing and about half a mile from the village of West Kingsdown.

Transport 
For transport there is the A20 road, the A225 road, the M20 motorway, the M26 motorway and the M25 motorway nearby. The nearest railway station is Otford railway station, about four miles away.

References 
 http://www.themodernantiquarian.com/site/4803/maplescombe_church_stone.html

Hamlets in Kent
Sevenoaks District